ITV Schools (full name: Independent Television for Schools and Colleges) was the educational television service set up in 1957 by the Independent Television Authority, broadcasting learning programmes for children ages 5 to 18 across ITV-affiliated stations. It was an example of public service broadcasting on a commercial television network (as opposed to the public BBC and their service BBC Schools).

ITV moved its schools programming to Channel 4 and S4C in autumn 1987 although ITV continued to produce programmes and the service continued to use the ITV name for another six years. The last ITV Schools programme on Channel 4 aired on Monday 28 June 1993; Channel 4 continued to produce their own schools programmes for many years afterwards.

History

The service started with a small audience, limited largely to the London area via its weekday franchise-holder Associated-Rediffusion. The service expanded as stations were added to the ITV network, and continued for the next 30 years, broadcasting a schedule of memorable documentaries, drama and entertainment programmes aimed at children between the ages of 5 and 18. These were almost all made by the various companies of the ITV network, mainly the largest ones such as Thames Television, ATV, Central Independent Television, Granada Television and Yorkshire Television.

Until the early 1970s, broadcasting hours were regulated by the British government. The commercial broadcasters, therefore, reserved their most commercial output for peak viewing hours and used the remainder of their broadcasting hours to put out their contractually obligated programming, conveniently enough, at a time when children were at school. Networked programmes for schools and colleges were mostly made by the "big four" weekday broadcasters Yorkshire, Granada, Thames and ATV, and were screened during the late morning and early afternoon, after which the network would close down until children's programmes commenced later in the afternoon.

Following changes to the law taking effect from Monday 16 October 1972, which allowed an extra 20 hours of broadcasting a week, the schools broadcasts were moved to a morning slot, between the hours of 0930 and 1200 during term time. This enabled the ITV broadcasters to open up the afternoon schedule to sell advertising between programmes; advertising was strictly prohibited during schools broadcasts.

The ITV Schools broadcasts gave teachers access to a broad spectrum of teaching resources, such as documentary film with which to illustrate their regular lessons, or songs and stories for children to learn and discuss, and could be considered an early example of multimedia learning. Activities and booklets based on the programmes were available to teachers via the educational officers based at the local ITV companies, allowing students to develop a relationship with the regular broadcasts. Typically, schools were equipped for schools television with a couple of large television receivers, sometimes housed inside a wooden cabinet atop a wheeled trolley which could be moved between classrooms as required.

This arrangement lasted until Monday 29 June 1987.

Presentation
Schools programmes on ITV were generally between ten and twenty minutes in length. Unlike peak-time programmes (which were usually scheduled at times rounded up to the nearest five minutes), schools programmes were scheduled at very precise times, such as 10:03 or 11:32. Some individual regions, such as HTV Wales, sometimes showed their own programming instead of the network offerings, but would rejoin the network in time for the next scheduled programme, and so it was necessary to devise a flexible presentation system which would allow the network to effectively fill the time between programmes without resorting to showing a blank screen. Network schools presentation was provided by ATV and later, Central Independent Television in Birmingham with live announcements made by ATV and Central's staff announcers including Mike Prince, Stewart White, Peter Davies and Su Evans.

Between programmes, interval music was played and a holding slide shown onscreen, identifying the service as Independent Television For Schools And Colleges and thus differentiating the service from the similar schools TV service run by the BBC, which were listed as "For Schools, Colleges" in the Radio Times until BBC Schools broadcasting moved to BBC2 in autumn 1983 with a new title of Daytime on Two. This holding slide could be shown for anything from a few seconds to a few minutes, depending on the length of time required to fill. A different theme for the holding slides was used each term, and usually each week a different slide would be used.

Exactly one minute before the start of the programme, the slide was replaced by a clock showing sixty second-marks, which gradually disappeared until there were none left. This gave the teacher one final minute in which to calm the class down before the programme began. A suitably timed piece of library music, changed once a term and often taken from the Bruton Music library, accompanied the animation.

The image of the 'schools countdown clock' has taken on something of a cult status, as referenced in programmes such as Look Around You, and produced a memorable image fondly remembered by generations of British schoolchildren. Look Around You series 1 was also a satire of ITV Schools and BBC Schools.

ITV Schools on Channel Four and S4C
After 30 years on ITV, the service moved to Channel 4 and S4C from 14 September 1987, allowing ITV to concentrate on building a fully commercial daytime schedule. Previously, between mid-May and mid-June that year, the service had been broadcast on Channel 4 as a form of trial, whilst ITV broadcast campaigning for the 1987 general election.

Just two pieces of interval music were used after 1987: The Journey for a 3D holding device, and Just a Minute which backed a redesigned clock.

The transmission times were the same, 09:30 – 12:00. At 09:28, the four ITV logos glided onto stage, followed by the first minute of The Journey, before gliding off stage. The 3D countdown clock spun onto screen at this point. For all other programmes the holding device would be faded up, and the music faded in at where it had reached. Once the tune had reached the end, the ITV logos glided off stage, and were replaced by the clock. Presentation was handled by Channel 4 in London with announcements for support material pre-recorded and voiced mainly by Central announcer Ted May in Birmingham (a role initially filled by Paul Veysey, another Central announcer).

In the run up to the move to Channel 4 and S4C, trailers were shown after schools programmes (and, in some regions, during regular programming) to promote the move, as well while also acknowledging and commemorating the 30th anniversary of the service.

With the introduction of breakfast television on Channel Four in April 1989, it was necessary to extend the first interval to five minutes due to the 9:25 am finish time of The Channel 4 Daily.  For the first three minutes, Channel 4 would play one of their own interval tracks – between April 1989 and the end of 1991 over a still of the 3D clock and throughout 1992, the ITV "rotomotion" between January 1992 and December 1992. In both cases, at 09:27:50 the music and image would be faded out, and then at exactly 09:28 the 3D logos glided onto stage.

On ITV, at the end of schools programmes, the regional ITV announcers would make their own closing announcements over a holding slide, before introducing the lunchtime programming.  On Channel 4, however, at the end of schools programming, the ITV logos glided onto stage, with the first ten seconds of The Journey.  This was rapidly faded to black, after which the Channel 4 logo appeared and the announcer introduced the next programme.

From Monday 11 January 1993, the holding device was no longer used for the first programme, and the introduction cut into 40 seconds of the clock. The holding device did appear for all other programmes. This ended on Monday 28 June 1993, signalling the end of this particular era and style of schools television broadcast. The very last programme on ITV Schools on 4 was The Technology Programme, at 11:41 am.

Since 20 September 1993, the strand has been known as Channel 4 Schools (later 4Learning), and is now Channel 4 Learning.

The two pieces of music used on Channel 4, the Journey and Just A Minute, were both written in 1986 by "James Aldenham", which was a pseudonym for Brian Bennett, former drummer with The Shadows, and who has, for many years, written TV themes, such as the BBC golf theme tune. Just a Minute also featured as background music on Coronation Street on 22 March 1998.

Educational programmes for schools continued to be broadcast on Channel 4 until 2009, although they were usually moved into commercially unviable timeslots, such as overnight, where they could be video-recorded by teachers for later consumption. The usual standard Channel 4 presentation devices were employed between programmes.

Regional variations on ITV Schools on Channel 4
Between September 1987 and June 1992, Grampian Television, Scottish Television, Border Television, Ulster Television (UTV)
and S4C opted out of the main ITV Schools on Channel 4 service to show regional ITV Schools programmes such as Swings & Roundabouts.

On S4C, Welsh-language programmes were seen under the S4C Ysgolion banner, and used their own holding devices and clock similar to ITV Schools, but used the same music as the national holding device. S4C used the traditional ITV Schools holding device for English language programmes, but the S4C logo was keyed over the Channel 4 logo on the aston bar at the bottom of the screen.

In preparation for Channel 4 becoming independent of ITV, all regional outputs ended at the end of the Summer Term in June 1992, with all programmes, such as Videomaths and How We Used to Live, fully networked. The only exception was S4C in Wales, which continued to opt out some English programmes for its Welsh-language programmes; this continued even after ITV Schools was re-branded as Channel 4 Schools, with S4C adopting S4C Schools for its English programmes, continuing to use S4C Ysgolion for its Welsh programmes.

Incidental music
 Suite No. 2 in B minor, BWV 1067 Movement 7 Badinerie (flute)

1957 in British television
British television shows for schools
Educational and instructional television channels
Educational broadcasting in the United Kingdom
ITV (TV network)
Television channels and stations established in 1957
Television channels and stations disestablished in 1993